Khagrachari or Khagrachhari is an upazila of Khagrachari District in the Division of Chittagong, Bangladesh.

Geography
It has 11,989 households and total area 297.92 km2.

Demographics
According to the  1991 Bangladesh census, Khagrachhari had a population of 61,306. Males constituted 54.02% of the population, and females 45.98%. The population aged 18 or over was 32,215. Khagrachhari had an average literacy rate of 33.7% (7+ years), against  the national average of 32.4%.

Administration
Khagrachhari Sadar Upazila is divided into Khagrachhari Municipality and five union parishads: Bhaibonchhara, Golabari, Kamalchhari, Khagrachhari, and Parachara. The union parishads are subdivided into 13 mauzas and 246 villages.

Khagrachhari Municipality is subdivided into 9 wards and 73 mahallas.

There are two government middle schools and one government college (high school) in Kharachari upazila.

See also
Upazilas of Bangladesh
Districts of Bangladesh
Divisions of Bangladesh

References

Upazilas of Khagrachhari District